Jaak Tarien (born 29 July 1974) is an Estonian military personnel (Brigadier General). and the current head of the Cooperative Cyber Defence Centre of Excellence since 2018.

Until 2018, he was the head of Estonian Air Force.

In 2003, he was awarded by the Order of the Cross of the Eagle, V Class.

Effective dates of promotion

Estonian Land Forces

References

Living people
1974 births
Estonian generals